Flower of Queen is a 2015 South Korean television series starring Kim Sung-ryung, Lee Sung-kyung, Lee Jong-hyuk and Yoon Park. It aired on MBC on Saturdays and Sundays 21:45 for 50 episodes beginning March 14, 2015.

Plot
Lee Soo-jung is at the end of her rope when her boyfriend leaves her and their newborn baby due to financial problems. So Soo-jung gives up her daughter for adoption, then migrates to the United States in search of the American dream. There, she changes her name to Rena Jung and enrolls at culinary school. But success eludes her, forcing her to return to Korea twenty years later. Still beautiful and extremely ambitious, Rena becomes a celebrity chef who hosts her own cooking show. She has no qualms about forging her credentials, manipulating people, and stealing others ideas. Her ultimate goal is to enter a loveless marriage for wealth and fame, and her target is Park Min-joon, eldest son of the chairman of TNC Group.

Park Min-joon lost his mother at a young age, and his father Park Tae-soo remarried, but his stepmother Ma Hee-ra drove a wedge between father and son with her scheming ways. Min-joon grows up to become a cynical, overly serious workaholic who has no interest in women and doesn't find them worth his time, but who hides a lonely soul craving for connection. Then one day, he meets Rena, who was hired to manage one of TNC Group's new restaurants. Min-joon becomes smitten with her and asks her to marry him. When he eventually finds out that Rena had orchestrated the whole ploy to seduce him so that she could someday take over TNC Group, he feels shocked and betrayed. But as Min-joon withdraws emotionally, Rena's feelings of love for him become real.

Min-joon's younger half-brother is rich playboy Park Jae-joon. He is obedient to the wishes of his mother Hee-ra, who dotes on him and pressured him to enter medical school and become a plastic surgeon. She sets up a matchmaking blind date in Kaohsiung, Taiwan with her son and Seo Yoo-ra, the only daughter of doctor couple Seo In-chul and Choi Hye-jin. But instead Jae-joon meets Kang Yi-sol, who unbeknownst to him Yoo-ra had paid to take her place. He falls for Yi-sol instantly, then becomes bitter and disappointed upon learning the truth, and mistakenly assumes Yi-sol to be mercenary.
	
Kang Yi-Sol had a happy and loving upbringing in Taiwan despite her poverty. Nursing a broken heart after her short, failed relationship with Jae-joon, she flies to Korea to attend her grandmother's funeral. While going through her grandmother's belongings, Yi-sol learns that the woman who raised her, Gu Yang-soon, is not her biological mother. She tracks down her biological father, who turns out to be Yoo-ra's father Seo In-chul, but he wants nothing to do with her. As she does further digging into the past, Yi-sol comes ever closer to finding out that the biological mother who abandoned her is none other than Rena Jung.

Cast
Kim Sung-ryung as Rena Jung/Jung Eun-hye/Lee Soo-jung, chef
Lee Sung-kyung as Kang Yi-sol, biological daughter of Rena and adoptive daughter of Yang-soon
Lee Jong-hyuk as Park Min-joon, elder son and heir apparent to TNC Group
Yoon Park as Park Jae-joon, younger step-brother of Min-joon and medical student

Park household
Kim Mi-sook as Ma Hee-ra, mother of Jae-joon and step-mother of Min-joon
Jang Yong as Park Tae-soo, father of Min-joon and Jae-joon, chairman of TNC Group
Sunwoo Yong-nyeo as Bang Eun-ah, mother of Hee-ra
Oh Dae-hwan as Ma Chang-soo, younger brother of Hee-ra

Seo household
Jang Young-nam as Choi Hye-jin, mother of Yoo-ra, plastic surgeon and friend of Hee-ra
Lee Hyung-chul as Seo In-chul, father of Yoo-ra, plastic surgeon
Go Woo-ri as Seo Yoo-ra, party girl studying in Kaohsiung who tries to get out of matchmaking date with Jae-joon

Yi-sol's family
Song Ok-sook as Gu Yang-soon, adoptive mother of Yi-sol
Lee Hye-in as Kang Eun-sol, younger sister of Yi-sol
Jo Hyung-ki as Heo Sam-shik, family friend who along with his two sons live with Yang-soon and her daughters
Kang Tae-oh as Heo Dong-gu, elder son of Sam-shik
Choi Ro-woon as Heo Young-gu, younger son of Sam-shik

Other characters
 Yang Jung-a as Jung Hee-yeon, talk show host 
Choi Eun-kyung as Chef Na
Jo Han-chul as Kim Do-shin
Jung Hee-tae as Julian
Son Hwa-ryung as Section Chief Oh
Kim Chae-yeon as Shin Ji-soo

Awards and nominations

References

External links
 
Flower of Queen at MBC Global Media
Flower of Queen at GnG Production
Flower of Queen at Kim Jong-hak Productions

2015 South Korean television series debuts
2015 South Korean television series endings
MBC TV television dramas
Korean-language television shows
South Korean melodrama television series
Television series by Kim Jong-hak Production